Miles B. Mack  is a British medical doctor who was chair of the Scottish Academy 2019–2022 and was chair of the Scottish council of the Royal College of General Practitioners (RCGP) 2014–2017. He works as a general practitioner in Dingwall in the north of Scotland.

Early life
Mack was born in Essex and lived there for 15 years, before his parents moved to the Highlands. He studied Medicine at the University of Edinburgh, qualifying in 1989.

Career
Mack has been a partner at Dingwall Medical Group since 1993.

He helped mark the centenary of the 1912 Dewar Report having helping undertake research into the contents of the work. He described Scottish Government’s plans to designate new controls on pharmacy applications as a significant step forward in health service planning for remote and rural and isolated areas. Mack has also highlighted the importance of support for people who experience difficulties related to mental health.

RCGP Scotland chair
In November 2014, Mack became the chair of the Scottish council of RCGP, succeeding Dr John Gillies. He was vice chair of the Academy of Medical Royal Colleges and Faculties in Scotland.

During his first year as RCGP Scotland chairman, Mack highlighted many issues that would need to be tackled in Scotland. He also spoke about how he saw general practice as a part of healthcare worth investing in, Following this the Scottish Government announced some further measures of support for general practice.

In November 2017, he was succeeded as the chair of the Scottish council of RCGP by Dr Carey Lunan. He became a member of the RCGP's trustee board that year, for a three year period.

Scottish Academy chair
In December 2019, he became chair of the Academy of Medical Royal Colleges and Faculties in Scotland (Scottish Academy), the first GP to hold this post.

Awards and honours
Mack became a Fellow of the RCGP in 2009. He was the recipient of the RCGP's Alastair Donald Award in 2012.

References

External links
 Miles Mack's column at Press and Journal newspaper
 Miles Mack's blog

Living people
20th-century Scottish medical doctors
21st-century Scottish medical doctors
Scottish general practitioners
Fellows of the Royal College of General Practitioners
Alumni of the University of Edinburgh
Place of birth missing (living people)
Date of birth missing (living people)
Year of birth missing (living people)